Wesley Kingston Whitten (1 August 1918 – 24 May 2010) was a professor of reproductive biology at the Australian National University and later director of the Jackson Laboratory, Bar Harbor, Maine, United States. He was educated at the University of Sydney receiving a BVSc with honors in 1939; a BSc in 1941; and  DSc in 1962. He was a Walter and Eliza Hall Fellow in Veterinary Science from 1940 to 1941. He served in the Australian Army Veterinary Corps
and was an Australian Army Service Corps Captain from 1941 to 1945. He was research officer in Commonwealth Scientific and Industrial Research Organisation (CSIRO) from 1946 to 1949. He was director of animal breeding and fellow in the John Curtin School of Medical Research, Australian National University from 1950 to 1961. He was assistant director of the National Biological Standards Laboratory, Canberra, Australia from 1961 to 1966. He was staff scientist at the Jackson Laboratory, Bar Harbor, Maine, USA from 1966 to 1969, became senior staff scientist from 1969 to 1980, and assistant director of research from 1971 to 1972. In 1982, he became a fellow of the Australian Academy of Science and he was awarded the Marshall Medal from the Society for the Study of Fertility in 1993.

He contributed to various areas in reproductive biology and fertility and was known for the Whitten effect.  In 2008, the Australian National University began building the Wes Whitten building, which is a generic animal accommodation facility for research

His father was a Methodist minister (Alfred Giles Whitten) and his mother was Ethel Annie Whitten (née Cock).  In 1941, he married Enid Elsbeth ('Beth') Cay Meredith. They had four children: Gregory, Mark, Jane, and Penelope.  In 2002, he married J. Mary Taylor after the death of Beth in 1999.

References

1918 births
2010 deaths
Australian biologists
Academic staff of the Australian National University
University of Sydney alumni
Fellows of the Australian Academy of Science